Graphic communication as the name suggests is communication using graphic elements. These elements include symbols such as glyphs and icons, images such as drawings and photographs, and can include the passive contributions of substrate, colour and surroundings. It is the process of creating, producing, and distributing material incorporating words and images to convey data, concepts, and emotions.

The field of graphics communications encompasses all phases of the graphic communications processes from origination of the idea (design, layout, and typography) through reproduction, finishing and distribution of two- or three-dimensional products or electronic transmission.

Overview 
Graphic Communications focuses on the technical aspects of producing and distributing items of visual communication. This includes technical aspects associated with the production of tangible items such as books, magazines and packaging, as well as digital items such as e-newsletters, interactive apps, websites, video and virtual reality applications. 

Graphic communication involves the use of visual material to relate ideas such as drawings, photographs, slides, and sketches. The drawings of plans and refinements and a rough map sketched to show the way could be considered graphical communication.

Graphic Design focuses on development of concepts and creation of visuals. This includes instruction regarding elements and principles of design, typography, image editing, web and video production, etc.

Any medium that uses a graphics to aid in conveying a message, instruction, or an idea is involved in graphical communication. One of the most widely used forms of graphical communication is the drawing.

History 
In the prehistoric period, communication was done visually and aurally and involved touching, either delicately or forcefully, as well as movements and gestures. The earliest graphics known to anthropologists studying prehistoric periods are cave paintings and markings on boulders, bone, ivory, and antlers, which were created during the Upper Paleolithic period from 40,000 to 10,000 B.C. or earlier. Many of these played a major role in geometry. They used graphics to represent their mathematical theories such as the Circle Theorem and the Pythagorean theorem.

Graphic communication topics

Graphics 
Graphics are visual presentations on some surface, such as a wall, canvas, computer screen, paper, or stone to brand, inform, illustrate, or entertain. Examples are photographs, drawings, line art, graphs, diagrams, typography, numbers, symbols, geometric designs, maps, engineering drawings, or other images. Graphics often combine text, illustration, and color. Graphic design may consist of the deliberate selection, creation, or arrangement of typography alone, as in a brochure, flier, poster, web site, or book without any other element. Clarity or effective communication may be the objective, association with other cultural elements may be sought, or merely, the creation of a distinctive style.

Graphics can be functional or artistic. The latter can be a recorded version, such as a photograph, or an interpretation by a scientist to highlight essential features, or an artist, in which case the distinction with imaginary graphics may become blurred.

Communication 
Communication is the process whereby information is imparted by a sender to a receiver via a medium. It requires that all parties have an area of communicative commonality. There are auditory means, such as speaking, singing and sometimes tone of voice, and nonverbal, physical means, such as body language, sign language, paralanguage, touch, eye contact, by using writing. Communication is defined as a process by which we assign and convey meaning in an attempt to create shared understanding.  This process requires a vast repertoire of skills in intrapersonal and interpersonal processing, listening, observing, speaking, questioning, analyzing, and evaluating. If you use these processes it is developmental and transfers to all areas of life: home, school, community, work, and beyond. It is through communication that collaboration and cooperation occur.

Visual communication 
Visual communication as the name suggests is communication through visual aid. It is the conveyance of ideas and information in forms that can be read or looked upon. Primarily associated with two dimensional images, it includes: signs, typography, drawing, graphic design, illustration, colour and electronic resources. It solely relies on vision. It is a form of communication with visual effect. It explores the idea that a visual message with text has a greater power to inform, educate or persuade a person.  It is communication by presenting information through Visual form. The evaluation of a good visual design is based on measuring comprehension by the audience, not on aesthetic or artistic preference.  There are no universally agreed-upon principles of beauty and ugliness.  There exists a variety of ways to present information visually, like gestures, body languages, video and TV. Here, focus is on the presentation of text, pictures, diagrams, photos, et cetera, integrated on a computer display. The term visual presentation is used to refer to the actual presentation of information. Recent research in the field has focused on web design and graphically oriented usability. Graphic designers use methods of visual communication in their professional practice.

Communication design 
Communication design is a mixed discipline between design and information-development which is concerned with how  intermission such as printed, crafted, electronic media or presentations communicate with people. A communication design approach is not only concerned with developing the message aside from the aesthetics in media, but also with creating new media channels to ensure the message reaches the target audience. Communication design seeks to attract, inspire, create desires and motivate the people to respond to messages, with a view to making a favorable impact to the bottom line of the commissioning body, which can be either to build a brand, move sales, or for humanitarian purposes. Its process involves strategic business thinking, utilizing market research, creativity, and problem-solving.

Graphic design 
The term graphic design can refer to a number of artistic and professional disciplines which focus on visual communication and presentation.  Various methods are used to create and combine symbols, images and/or words to create a visual representation of ideas and messages. A graphic designer may use typography, visual arts and page layout techniques to produce the final result.  Graphic design often refers to both the process (designing) by which the communication is created and the products (designs) which are generated.

Common uses of graphic design include magazines, advertisements, product packaging and web design.  For example, a product package might include a logo or other artwork, organized text and pure design elements such as shapes and color which unify the piece.  Composition is one of the most important features of graphic design especially when using pre-existing materials or diverse elements.

Graphical representation 
The term representation, according to O'Shaughnessy and Stadler (2005), can carry a range of meanings and interpretations. In literary theory representation is commonly defined in 3 ways.
 To look like or resemble
 To stand in for something or someone
 To present a second time to re-present

Representation, according to Mitchell (1995), began with early literary theory in the ideas of Plato and Aristotle, and has evolved into a significant component of language, Saussurian and communication studies. Aristotle discusses representation in 3 ways:
 The object: The symbol being represented.
 Manner: The way the symbol is represented.
 Means: The material that is used to represent it.
The means of literary representation is language. The means of graphical representation are graphics. Graphical representation of data is one of the most commonly used modes of presentation.
The purpose of graphical communication is transfer message or information to the receiver in effective way. When professional organizations prepare reports, they usually use the mode of graphical presentations.

See also 
Related subjects
 Graphicacy
 Technical

Related experts
 Stuart Bailey
 Rosemary Sassoon
 Michael Twyman
 Gerard Unger

Related organizations
 American Institute of Graphic Arts
 High School of Graphic Communication Arts

References 

Nonverbal communication
Communication design
Visual thinking
Technical drawing